Jewish Museum of Turkey (officially Quincentennial Foundation Museum of Turkish Jews) is a cultural center established by the Quincentennial Foundation to inform the society of the traditions and history of Turkish Jewry. It was inaugurated on November 25, 2001. The Quincentennial Foundation was established in 1989 by 113 Turkish citizens, Jews and Muslims alike, to celebrate the five hundredth anniversary of the arrival of Sephardim to the Ottoman Empire. The idea of a museum was proposed by Naim Güleryüz who is now its curator and the foundation was financed by the prominent Jewish Kamhi family.

The building

The museum building, formerly known as Zülfaris Synagogue, was restored and remodelled to suit a museum. There is evidence that this synagogue existed in 1671, and its foundations suggest that another structure was built during the colony of the Republic of Genoa. It was recorded as "Holy Sinavi (Synagogue) in Galata" or "Kal Kadoş Galata", it was called as "Zulfaris" which is thought to have derived from the Persian word "Zülf-ü Arus", meaning "the fringe of a bride". However the actual building was re-erected over its original foundations presumably in the early 19th century, probably in 1823.

Time line

 1882 -  The marble frame surrounding the Ehal (Ark) was donated by Samuel Malki.
 1890 -  Repair work was carried out with the financial assistance of the Camondo Family.
 1904 -  Restoration work was conducted by the Jewish Community of Galata presided over by Jak Bey de Leon.
 1968 -  Went through substantial repair.
 1979 -  Assigned for worship for the Jews of Thracian origin.
 1983 -  Last wedding in Zülfaris.
 1985 - Ceased to serve as synagogue due to lack of a congregation, and allocated to the Quincentennial Foundation by the Neve Shalom Foundation.
 2001 -  With the financial backing of the Kamhi Family and the contributions of Jak Kamhi, it was inaugurated as a museum.

Museum design
Jewish Museum of Turkey includes sections on the intermingling cultures of Jewish and Muslim Turks and ethnographic articles that depict the traditions of Turkish Jews, as well as the historical accounts of the Jewish odyssey from Spain to Turkey.

Entrance to the building is through an iron gate into a courtyard, in which a metal sculpture by Nadia Arditti is located. Titled the "Statue of the Rising Fire", it is in memory of the Turkish Jews who died fighting in the Balkan, Dalmatia, Caucasus, Palestine, Tripolitania, Dardannelles, Korea and Liberation wars.

The octagonal main hall on the entrance floor information panels related to the history of the Zülfaris Synagogue, the Hahambaşı institution, daily life of Jews living in Istanbul and Anatolia, as well as artifacts such as letters, maps, tallits, fermans (imperial decrees) are on display. A copy of the Lausanne Treaty that recognized the sovereignty of the Republic of Turkey and with which Turkish Jews relinquished their minority privileges. The ehal (ark) on the same floor holds two torah scrolls which can be viewed. On another information panel, Jewish academicians who fled to Turkey from Europe during the Second World War and Turkish diplomats who helped Jews escape the Holocaust, some of which are Righteous Among the Nations are introduced.

The balcony, which used to be the prayer section for women holds some paintings depicting daily lives of the local Jewish community. The lower, ground floor is organized chronologically as an ethnographic section with photographs, paintings and objects pertaining to birth, circumcision, wedding, clothing, jewelry, etc.

Gallery

See also
 History of the Jews in Turkey
 List of synagogues in Turkey

References and notes

External links
 Jewish Museum of Turkey
 Chief Rabbinate of Turkey
 Shalom Newspaper, the main Jewish newspaper in Turkey

Jews and Judaism in Istanbul
Museums in Istanbul
Turkey
Museums established in 2001
Israel–Turkey relations
Synagogues in Istanbul
Golden Horn
Synagogues preserved as museums
Buildings and structures in Beyoğlu
Synagogues in the Ottoman Empire
2001 establishments in Turkey
21st-century religious buildings and structures in Turkey